Hesar-e Qajar (also Romanized as Ḩeşār-e Qājār and Ḩeşār Qājār; also known as Kadzhar and Qājar) is a village in Howmeh Rural District, in the Central District of Abhar County, Zanjan Province, Iran. At the 2006 census, its population was 330, in 94 families.

References 

Populated places in Abhar County